In mathematics, and specifically in operator theory, a positive-definite function on a group relates the notions of positivity, in the context of Hilbert spaces, and algebraic groups. It can be viewed as a particular type of positive-definite kernel where the underlying set has the additional group structure.

Definition 

Let G be a group, H be a complex Hilbert space, and L(H) be the bounded operators on H. 
A positive-definite function on G is a function  that satisfies

for every function h: G → H with finite support (h takes non-zero values for only finitely many s).

In other words, a function F: G → L(H) is said to be a positive-definite function if the kernel K: G × G → L(H) defined by K(s, t) = F(s−1t) is a positive-definite kernel.

Unitary representations 

A unitary representation is a unital homomorphism Φ: G → L(H) where Φ(s) is a unitary operator for all s. For such Φ, Φ(s−1) = Φ(s)*.

Positive-definite functions on G are intimately related to unitary representations of G. Every unitary representation of G gives rise to a family of positive-definite functions. Conversely, given a positive-definite function, one can define a unitary representation of G in a natural way. 

Let Φ: G → L(H) be a unitary representation of G. If P ∈ L(H) is the projection onto a closed subspace H` of H. Then F(s) = P Φ(s) is a positive-definite function on G with values in L(H`). This can be shown readily: 

for every h: G → H` with finite support. If G has a topology and Φ is weakly(resp. strongly) continuous, then clearly so is F.

On the other hand, consider now a positive-definite function F on G. A unitary representation of G can be obtained as follows. Let C00(G, H) be the family of functions h: G → H with finite support. The corresponding positive kernel K(s, t) = F(s−1t) defines a (possibly degenerate) inner product on C00(G, H). Let the resulting Hilbert space be denoted by V. 

We notice that the "matrix elements" K(s, t) = K(a−1s, a−1t) for all a, s, t in G. So Uah(s) = h(a−1s) preserves the inner product on V, i.e. it is unitary in L(V). It is clear that the map Φ(a) = Ua is a representation of G on V.

The unitary representation is unique, up to Hilbert space isomorphism, provided the following minimality condition holds:

where  denotes the closure of the linear span.

Identify H as elements (possibly equivalence classes) in V, whose support consists of the identity element e ∈ G, and let P be the projection onto this subspace. Then we have PUaP = F(a) for all a ∈ G.

Toeplitz kernels 

Let G be the additive group of integers Z. The kernel K(n, m) = F(m − n) is called a kernel of Toeplitz type, by analogy with Toeplitz matrices. If F is of the form F(n) = Tn where T is a bounded operator acting on some Hilbert space. One can show that the kernel K(n, m) is positive if and only if T is a contraction. By the discussion from the previous section, we have a unitary representation of Z, Φ(n) = Un for a unitary operator U. Moreover, the property PUaP = F(a) now translates to  PUnP = Tn. This is precisely Sz.-Nagy's dilation theorem and hints at an important dilation-theoretic characterization of positivity that leads to a parametrization of arbitrary positive-definite kernels.

References 
Christian Berg, Christensen, Paul Ressel, Harmonic Analysis on Semigroups, GTM, Springer Verlag.
T. Constantinescu, Schur Parameters, Dilation and Factorization Problems, Birkhauser Verlag, 1996.
B. Sz.-Nagy and C. Foias, Harmonic Analysis of Operators on Hilbert Space, North-Holland, 1970.
Z. Sasvári, Positive Definite and Definitizable Functions, Akademie Verlag, 1994
J. H. Wells, L. R. Williams, Embeddings and extensions in analysis, Ergebnisse der Mathematik und ihrer Grenzgebiete, Band 84. Springer-Verlag, New York-Heidelberg,  1975. vii+108 pp.

Operator theory
Representation theory of groups